Three Months is a 2022 American comedy-drama film written and directed by Jared Frieder, and starring Troye Sivan, Viveik Kalra, Brianne Tju, Javier Muñoz, Judy Greer, Amy Landecker, Louis Gossett Jr. and Ellen Burstyn. It was released on Paramount+ on February 23, 2022.

Plot
On the eve of his high school graduation, Caleb Kahn, a South Florida boy realizes he has been exposed to HIV. While he waits three months for the definitive tests on his status, he finds love in the most unlikely of places, and gets help from many new friends.

Cast
 Troye Sivan as Caleb
 Viveik Kalra as Estha
 Brianne Tju as Dara
 Javier Muñoz as Dr. Diaz
 Judy Greer as Suzanne
 Amy Landecker as Edith
 Louis Gossett Jr. as Benny
 Ellen Burstyn as Valerie

Reception
Curtis M. Wong from Huff Post said "As a coming-of-age comedy-drama, Three Months is heartfelt and forward-thinking, probing the challenges young LGBTQ people face in a thoughtfully humorous way. Sivan gives the film a boost of star power but otherwise leaves all traces of his pop artist persona behind, capturing Caleb's self-effacing wit and relatable insecurities with refreshing nuance."'

The film was a New York Times Critic's Pick and nominated for the 2022 Humanitas Prize. On review aggregator Rotten Tomatoes, the film has an approval rating of 79% based on 14 reviews, with an average rating of 6.10/10.

Sivan was nominated for the Most Popular Australian Actor or Actress in an International Program at the 2022 Logie Awards for his work on the film. The film was also nominated for the Critics' Choice Award for Best Movie Made for Television at the 28th Critics' Choice Awards. The film was nominated for the GLAAD Media Award for Outstanding Film – Streaming or TV.

References

External links

2022 films
2022 LGBT-related films
2022 romantic comedy-drama films
2020s coming-of-age comedy-drama films
2020s teen comedy-drama films
2020s teen romance films
American coming-of-age comedy-drama films
American romantic comedy-drama films
American teen comedy-drama films
American teen LGBT-related films
American teen romance films
Films scored by Roger Neill
Gay-related films
HIV/AIDS in American films
LGBT-related coming-of-age films
LGBT-related romantic comedy-drama films
MTV Films films
Paramount+ original films
2020s English-language films
2020s American films